KEDI is a Full Service formatted broadcast radio station licensed to and serving Bethel, Alaska.  KEDI is owned and operated by Strait Media, LLC.

References

External links
 

2015 establishments in Alaska
Bethel, Alaska
Full service radio stations in the United States
Radio stations established in 2015
EDI